The Church of St Mary the Virgin in Batcombe, Somerset, England, dates from the 15th and 16th centuries and was restored in the 19th. It has been designated by English Heritage as a Grade I listed building.

The church is built of limestone from the Doulting Stone Quarry. The tower, which has triple belfry openings, contains six  bells dating from 1760 and made by Thomas Bilbie, of the Bilbie family, in Cullompton.

The interior of the church includes an octagonal font. The stained glass windows include one at the eastern end of the south aisle by Heaton, Butler and Bayne which was installed around 1896 and the east window from 1930 by Archibald Keightley Nicholson.

The churchyard contains the war grave of a Royal Navy sailor of World War I.

The parish is part of the deanery of Bruton and Cary within the Wells Archdeanery.

See also

 List of Grade I listed buildings in Mendip
 List of towers in Somerset
 List of ecclesiastical parishes in the Diocese of Bath and Wells

References

16th-century Church of England church buildings
Batcombe
Batcombe
Batcombe